The Essex County Park Commission Administration Building is located in Newark, Essex County, New Jersey, United States. The building was built in 1916 and was added to the National Register of Historic Places on November 11, 1977.

See also
 National Register of Historic Places listings in Essex County, New Jersey
 Essex County Park System, New Jersey

References

County government buildings in the United States
Renaissance Revival architecture in New Jersey
Government buildings completed in 1894
Buildings and structures in Newark, New Jersey
National Register of Historic Places in Newark, New Jersey
New Jersey Register of Historic Places
County government buildings in New Jersey